Idiomarina donghaiensis is a Gram-negative, aerobic, rod-shaped and motile bacterium from the genus of Idiomarina which has been isolated from seawater from the East China Sea.

References

Bacteria described in 2009
Alteromonadales